The Painter's Daughters Chasing a Butterfly is a painting by Thomas Gainsborough. It was created sometime in 1756 and is now in the collection of the National Gallery in London.

Analysis
The painting depicts Mary ("Molly", 31 January 1750 - 2 July 1826) and Margaret ("Peggy", 19 August 1751 - 18 December 1820) Gainsborough engaging in the titular activity. The younger daughter reaching to grab the butterfly represents the fragility of life while the elder daughter's apprehensive facial expression reveals her edging towards maturity. The Painter's Daughters Chasing a Butterfly proved to be a pivotal moment in Gainsborough's artistry as Jonathan Jones writes that "[it] was one of the first works in which Gainsborough developed from his early, Dutch-realist manner to the exuberant scale of his later portraits".

References 

Oil on canvas paintings
1756 paintings
Paintings by Thomas Gainsborough
Collections of the National Gallery, London
Paintings of children
Insects in art